The Torani Canal in northeastern Guyana serves to move water from the Berbice River into the Canje River. It was to serve as irrigation for the sugar industry, and subsequently the rice industry.

The canal is 14 miles long. The Berbice River inlet is located some 80 km from the sea where, although subject to tidal influence, flow is fresh throughout the year. A five-door sluice controls the flow of water into the canal.  The outlet on the Canje River is near the community of Wel te Vreeden. A three-door sluice controls flow out of the canal.

It was rehabilitated by BK International Inc. under the supervision of the Caribbean Engineering Management Consultancy Guyana Limited in collaboration with Mott Mac Donald. The dual purpose of the canal is to transfer water from the higher elevation along the Berbice River to irrigate the backlands of the Black Bush Polder rice cultivation and at the same time to reduce the excessive surface runoff precipitation during the rainy season. Hence, the Canje River is at a lower elevation and it's the shortest distance of the two to the Atlantic Ocean “storehouse”.

See also 

 Agriculture in Guyana
 East Demerara Water Conservancy

References 

Canals in Guyana
Geography of Guyana